The silver distichodus (Distichodus affinis) is a species of fish in the family Distichodontidae. It is found in the Congo River basin in Africa.

References

Distichodus
Fish described in 1873
Taxa named by Albert Günther